Ian McKellen on Stage: With Tolkien, Shakespeare, Others and YOU is a one-man stage performance by English stage and screen actor Sir Ian McKellen.

The performance sees McKellen reprising roles over his career in the theatre (such as the works of William Shakespeare), on film (such as Gandalf in J. R. R. Tolkien's The Lord of the Rings film series) while discussing anecdotes throughout his life and career.

All profits for ticket sales were donated to each venue and organisation for specific causes or an arts-related charity.

Performances

Park Theatre, London (2017) 
McKellen first presented the show as Ian McKellen with Shakespeare, Tolkien, Others & You at the Park Theatre, London from 3 to 9 July 2017, directed by Jez Bond.

UK and Ireland tour (2019) 
To celebrate his 80th birthday, McKellen toured the show across the UK and Ireland from January to September 2019, directed by Sean Mathias and produced by the Ambassador Theatre Group. The tour dates were as follows;

Harold Pinter Theatre, London (2019-2020) 
Following the success of the UK and Ireland tour, it was announced that McKellen would perform the show at the Harold Pinter Theatre in London's West End for a limited run from 20 September 2019 to 5 January 2020.

Hudson Theatre, Broadway (One Make Believe) (2019) 
For one night only on the 5 November 2019, McKellen performed the show at the Hudson Theatre on Broadway as part of the Only Make Believe charity.

Home media 
The show was recorded during the run at the Harold Pinter Theatre in the West End by the National Theatre where it can be rented or seen as part of a subscription, and released on Amazon Prime on 11 June 2021.

References 

2019 in theatre
2019 plays
West End plays
Plays for one performer